Meggen Zentrum railway station is a railway station in the municipality of Meggen, in the Swiss canton of Lucerne. It is an intermediate stop on the standard gauge Lucerne–Immensee line of Swiss Federal Railways.

Services 
 the following services stop at Meggen Zentrum:

  Voralpen-Express: hourly service between Lucerne and St. Gallen.
 Lucerne S-Bahn : hourly service between Lucerne and Brunnen.

References

External links 
 

Railway stations in the canton of Lucerne
Swiss Federal Railways stations